This is a partial list of notable Tuvan people.

Military personnel
 Kidispey Choodu
 Sergey Shoygu

Politicians
Khertek Anchimaa-Toka
Sodnam Balkhyr
Adyg Tyulyush Chulydum
Sat Churmet-Dazhi
Kaadyr-ool Bicheldey
Mongush Buyan-Badyrgy
Salchak Idam-Syuryun
Adyg-Tulush Khemchik-ool
Donduk Kuular
Mongush Nimachap
Sherig-ool Oorzhak
Soyan Oruygu
Maady Lopsan-Osur
Polat Oyun
Salchak Toka

Singers
Kaigal-ool Khovalyg
Albert Kuvezin
Maxim Munzuk
Sainkho Namtchylak
Kongar-ol Ondar
Aldyn-ool Sevek
Gennadi Tumat

Writers
Vlad Boll-or
Mongush Kenin-Lopsan
Galsan Tschinag

Esports Athletes
Alexander Khertek, also known as TORONTOTOKYO